Hicks City is an unincorporated community in Jackson County, in the U.S. state of Missouri.

History
A post office called Hicks City was established in 1872, and remained in operation until 1906. The community has the name of Russell Hicks, an original owner of the site.

References

Unincorporated communities in Jackson County, Missouri
Unincorporated communities in Missouri